Slinovce is a dispersed settlement in the low hills on the right bank of the Krka River in the Municipality of Kostanjevica na Krki in eastern Slovenia. The area is part of the traditional region of Lower Carniola and is now included in the Lower Sava Statistical Region.

There is a small chapel-shrine at the crossroads west of the settlement. It is dedicated to the Virgin Mary and was built in the early 20th century.

References

External links
Slinovce on Geopedia

Populated places in the Municipality of Kostanjevica na Krki